Livia Lancelot (born 11 February 1988) is a French professional motocross racer.

Born in Saint-Denis, France, Lancelot became the first ever Women's world champion in the history of motocross, winning the inaugural FIM Women's Motocross World Championship in 2008. Lancelot was awarded the Circuiti Gioielli Women's Pole Position Award in Mantua, Italy, and has also won some other competitions. She repeated as Women's motocross world champion in 2016.

Career results

Notes

External links
Official site
Kawasaki Team profile

Sportspeople from Saint-Denis, Seine-Saint-Denis
Female motorcycle racers
French motocross riders
1988 births
Living people
French sportswomen